|-
! colspan="2" style="text-align: center;" | HD 178911 B
|-
| Mass || 
|-
| Radius || 
|-
| Luminosity || 
|-
| Surface gravity (log g) || 
|-
| Temperature || 
|-
| Metallicity [Fe/H] || 0.23
|-
| Rotational velocity (v sin i) || 4.6
|-
| Age || 
|-

HD 178911 is a triple star system with an exoplanetary companion in the northern constellation of Lyra. With a combined apparent visual magnitude of 6.70, it is a challenge to view with the naked eye. The system is located at a distance of approximately 161 light years from the Sun based on parallax measurements, but is drifting closer with a radial velocity of −38 km/s.

Stellar system
A companion star, designated component B, was first reported by F. G. W. Struve in 1823. As of 2019, the two have an angular separation of  along a position angle of 263°. Component B shares a common motion through space with the primary, and thus they form a wide binary. This secondary is a magnitude 7.88 G-type main-sequence star with a stellar classification of G5V. The physical properties of this star are similar to the Sun, although it has a higher metallicity.

In 1985, the primary was determined to be a spectroscopic binary pair using the CHARA speckle interferometry program. They are magnitude 6.89 and 8.96. Based on based on a combined class of G5V for the pair, they have derived main sequence stellar classifications of G1V and K1V, respectively. C. D. Farrington and associates (2014) found dynamic masses for the components of 0.80 and 0.62, respectively. However, based on the classes, the expected masses should be around 1.0 and 0.8. Manuel Andrade (2019) derived higher dynamic masses of 1.20 and 0.94.

An additional companion HD 178911C is a chance optical alignment and is not part of the system.

Planetary system
In 2001 an extrasolar planet was discovered in orbit around HD 178911B.

See also 
 List of extrasolar planets

References

External links 

G-type main-sequence stars
K-type main-sequence stars
Triple star systems
Planetary systems with one confirmed planet

Lyra (constellation)
Durchmusterung objects
178911
094076
7272